The Ambassador of the United Kingdom to Ethiopia is the United Kingdom's foremost diplomatic representative in the Federal Democratic Republic of Ethiopia, and head of the UK's diplomatic mission in Addis Ababa.

The British Embassy in Addis Ababa also represents British interests in the Republic of Djibouti and the African Union whose secretariat is based in Addis Ababa.

Envoy Extraordinary and Minister Plenipotentiary
1903–1909: Sir John Harrington (Agent from 1898, Consul-General from 1900, Minister Plenipotentiary from 1903, local rank of Envoy Extraordinary and Minister Plenipotentiary from 1908)
1909–1919: Wilfred Thesiger (Consul-General with local rank of Envoy Extraordinary and Minister Plenipotentiary)
1920–1925: Claud Russell
1925–1928: Charles Bentinck
1928–1929: Sydney Waterlow
1929–1936: Sir Sidney Barton
1936–1941: No representation due to occupation by Italy
1942–1945: Robert Howe
1946–1948: Harold Farquhar
1948–1951: Daniel Lascelles

Ambassador Extraordinary and Plenipotentiary
1949–1951: Daniel Lascelles
1952–1956: Douglas Busk
1956–1959: Geoffrey Furlonge
1959–1962: Denis Wright
1962–1966: Sir John Russell
1966–1969: Thomas Bromley
1969–1972: Alan Campbell
1972–1975: Willie Morris
1975–1978: Derek Day
1979–1982: Robert Tesh
1982–1986: Brian Barder
1986–1990: Harold Walker
1990–1994: James Glaze
1994–1997: Robin Christopher
1997–2000: Gordon Wetherell (also to Eritrea and Djibouti)
2000–2004: Myles Wickstead (also to Djibouti)
2004–2007: Robert Dewar (also to African Union)
2008–2011: Norman Ling (also to Djibouti and African Union)
2011–2016: Gregory Dorey (also to Djibouti, Somaliland and African Union)
2016–2018: Susanna Moorehead (also to Djibouti and African Union)

2019–: Alastair McPhail (also to Djibouti and African Union)

References

External links

Ethiopia
 
 
United Kingdom